The 2021–22 New York Knicks season was the 76th season of the franchise in the National Basketball Association (NBA). On March 31, 2022, the Knicks were eliminated from playoff contention after the Atlanta Hawks won against the Cleveland Cavaliers.

Draft

The Knicks entered the draft holding two first round picks and two second round picks. The 21st overall pick was acquired on January 31, 2019, in a trade with the Dallas Mavericks. The 32nd overall pick was acquired on February 6, 2020, in a three-team trade with the Los Angeles Clippers and Washington Wizards. The 58th overall pick was acquired on March 25, 2021, in a three-team trade with the Philadelphia 76ers and Oklahoma City Thunder. The Knicks used their 19th overall pick to select Kai Jones, and then selected Keon Johnson (21st overall pick), Jeremiah Robinson-Earl (32nd overall pick) and Jericho Sims (58th overall pick). After getting selected in the draft, Jones was traded to the Charlotte Hornets, Johnson was traded to the Los Angeles Clippers, while Robinson-Earl was traded to the Oklahoma City Thunder.

Roster

Standings

Division

Conference

Game log

Preseason
The preseason schedule was announced on August 24, 2021.

|- style="background:#bfb;"
| 1
| October 5
| Indiana
| 
| Randle (20)
| Randle (9)
| Quickley (7)
| Madison Square Garden10,090
| 1–0
|- style="background:#bfb;"
| 2
| October 9
| @ Washington
| 
| Barrett (18)
| Sims (13)
| Rose (8)
| Capital One Arena8,060
| 2–0
|- style="background:#bfb;"
| 3
| October 13
| Detroit
| 
| Randle (29)
| Randle (11)
| Barrett (6)
| Madison Square Garden11,226
| 3–0
|- style="background:#bfb;"
| 4
| October 15
| Washington
| 
| Rose (28)
| Randle (10)
| Rose, Walker (6)
| Madison Square Garden12,258
| 4–0

Regular season
The regular season schedule was released on August 20, 2021.

|- style="background:#bfb;"
| 1
| October 20
| Boston
| 
| Randle (35)
| Robinson (17)
| Randle (9)
| Madison Square Garden19,812
| 1–0
|- style="background:#bfb;"
| 2
| October 22
| @ Orlando
| 
| Randle (21)
| Randle (10)
| Burks, Randle, Rose (7)
| Amway Center18,846
| 2–0
|- style="background:#fbb;"
| 3
| October 24
| Orlando
| 
| Randle (30)
| Randle (16)
| Barrett (5)
| Madison Square Garden16,273
| 2–1
|- style="background:#bfb;"
| 4
| October 26
| Philadelphia
| 
| Walker (19)
| Randle (11)
| Randle (7)
| Madison Square Garden15,218
| 3–1
|- style="background:#bfb;"
| 5
| October 28
| @ Chicago
| 
| Walker (21)
| Randle (16)
| Randle (9)
| United Center20,972
| 4–1
|- style="background:#bfb;"
| 6
| October 30
| @ New Orleans
| 
| Barrett (35)
| Barrett (8)
| Barrett (6)
| Smoothie King Center16,508
| 5–1

|- style="background:#fbb;"
| 7
| November 1
| Toronto
| 
| Barrett (27)
| Robinson (12)
| Quickley, Randle (5)
| Madison Square Garden16,528
| 5–2
|- style="background:#fbb;"
| 8
| November 3
| @ Indiana
| 
| Barrett (23)
| Randle (14)
| Walker (4)
| Bankers Life Fieldhouse11,607
| 5–3
|- style="background:#bfb;"
| 9
| November 5
| @ Milwaukee
| 
| Randle (32)
| Noel (13)
| Randle, Rose (4)
| Fiserv Forum17,341
| 6–3
|- style="background:#fbb;"
| 10
| November 7
| Cleveland
| 
| Randle (19)
| Randle, Robinson (7)
| Randle (7)
| Madison Square Garden19,040
| 6–4
|- style="background:#bfb;"
| 11
| November 8
| @ Philadelphia
| 
| Randle (31)
| Randle (12)
| Walker (5)
| Wells Fargo Center20,224
| 7–4
|- style="background:#fbb;"
| 12
| November 10
| Milwaukee
| 
| Rose (22)
| Gibson (9)
| Rose (7)
| Madison Square Garden18,027
| 7–5
|- style="background:#fbb;"
| 13
| November 12
| @ Charlotte
| 
| Walker (26)
| Burks (9)
| Randle (5)
| Spectrum Center19,257
| 7–6
|- style="background:#bfb;"
| 14
| November 15
| Indiana
| 
| Quickley, Walker (16)
| Randle (11)
| Rose (7)
| Madison Square Garden16,792
| 8–6
|- style="background:#fbb;"
| 15
| November 17
| Orlando
| 
| Barrett (17)
| Robinson (11)
| Quickley (7)
| Madison Square Garden16,680
| 8–7
|- style="background:#bfb;"
| 16
| November 20
| Houston
| 
| Burks (20)
| Randle (10)
| Randle (9)
| Madison Square Garden19,812
| 9–7
|- style="background:#fbb;"
| 17
| November 21
| @ Chicago
| 
| Randle (34)
| Barrett (15)
| Walker (4)
| United Center21,813
| 9–8
|- style="background:#bfb;"
| 18
| November 23
| L.A. Lakers
| 
| Fournier (26)
| Randle (16)
| Randle, Walker (5)
| Madison Square Garden19,812
| 10–8
|- style="background:#fbb;"
| 19
| November 26
| Phoenix
| 
| Walker (17)
| Robinson (8)
| Quickley, Randle (4)
| Madison Square Garden19,812
| 10–9
|- style="background:#bfb;"
| 20
| November 27
| @ Atlanta
| 
| Burks (23)
| Randle, Robinson (11)
| Quickley (7)
| State Farm Arena17,287
| 11–9
|- style="background:#fbb;"
| 21
| November 30
| @ Brooklyn
| 
| Burks (25)
| Randle (9)
| Rose (9)
| Barclays Center18,081
| 11–10

|- style="background:#fbb;"
| 22
| December 2
| Chicago
| 
| Randle (30)
| Randle (12)
| Randle, Rose (6)
| Madison Square Garden19,812
| 11–11
|- style="background:#fbb;"
| 23
| December 4
| Denver
| 
| Randle (24)
| Toppin (8)
| Randle (8)
| Madison Square Garden18,272
| 11–12
|- style="background:#bfb;"
| 24
| December 7
| @ San Antonio
| 
| Barrett (32)
| Robinson (14)
| Randle (8)
| AT&T Center14,698
| 12–12
|- style="background:#fbb;"
| 25
| December 8
| @ Indiana
| 
| Barrett (19)
| Randle (8)
| Rose (7)
| Bankers Life Fieldhouse13,167
| 12–13
|- style="background:#fbb;"
| 26
| December 10
| @ Toronto
| 
| Barrett (19)
| Randle (14)
| Burks, Randle (5)
| Scotiabank Arena19,800
| 12–14
|- style="background:#fbb;"
| 27
| December 12
| Milwaukee
| 
| Grimes (27)
| Randle (10)
| Randle, Rose (7)
| Madison Square Garden19,812
| 12–15
|- style="background:#fbb;"
| 28
| December 14
| Golden State
| 
| Randle (31)
| Knox, Noel, Randle (7)
| Rose (6)
| Madison Square Garden19,812
| 12–16
|- style="background:#bfb;"
| 29
| December 16
| @ Houston
| 
| Quickley (24)
| Burks, Robinson (9)
| McBride (9)
| Toyota Center13,857
| 13–16
|- style="background:#fbb;"
| 30
| December 18
| @ Boston
| 
| Fournier (32)
| Randle (9)
| Randle (7)
| TD Garden19,156
| 13–17
|- style="background:#bfb;"
| 31
| December 21
| Detroit
| 
| Fournier (22)
| Robinson (14)
| Burks (6)
| Madison Square Garden17,906
| 14–17
|- style="background:#fbb;"
| 32
| December 23
| Washington
| 
| Walker (44)
| Randle, Walker (9)
| Walker (8)
| Madison Square Garden18,208
| 14–18
|- style="background:#bfb;"
| 33
| December 25
| Atlanta
| 
| Randle (25)
| Randle (12)
| Walker (12)
| Madison Square Garden19,812
| 15–18
|- style="background:#bfb;"
| 34
| December 28
| @ Minnesota
| 
| Robinson (14)
| Robinson (18)
| Quickley (4)
| Target Center16,339
| 16–18
|- style="background:#bfb;"
| 35
| December 29
| @ Detroit
| 
| Burks (34)
| Randle (10)
| Randle (5)
| Little Caesars Arena18,312
| 17–18
|- style="background:#fbb;"
| 36
| December 31
| @ Oklahoma City
| 
| Barrett (26)
| Robinson (12)
| Barrett, Fournier (3)
| Paycom Center16,451
| 17–19

|- style="background:#fbb;"
| 37
| January 2
| @ Toronto
| 
| Fournier (20)
| Gibson (7)
| Toppin (6)
| Scotiabank ArenaNo in-person attendance
| 17–20
|- style="background:#bfb;"
| 38
| January 4
| Indiana
| 
| Barrett (32)
| Randle (16)
| Burks, Randle (4)
| Madison Square Garden18,449
| 18–20
|- style="background:#bfb;"
| 39
| January 6
| Boston
| 
| Fournier (41)
| Burks (9)
| Burks (7)
| Madison Square Garden17,529
| 19–20
|- style="background:#fbb;"
| 40
| January 8
| @ Boston
| 
| Barrett (19)
| Randle (12)
| Randle (6)
| TD Garden19,156
| 19–21
|- style="background:#bfb;"
| 41
| January 10
| San Antonio
| 
| Barrett (31)
| Randle (12)
| Grimes, Quickley (6)
| Madison Square Garden16,569
| 20–21
|- style="background:#bfb;"
| 42
| January 12
| Dallas
| 
| Barrett (32)
| Randle (12)
| Randle (8)
| Madison Square Garden18,215
| 21–21
|- style="background:#bfb;"
| 43
| January 15
| @ Atlanta
| 
| Barrett (26)
| Robinson (13)
| Randle (9)
| State Farm Arena16,414
| 22–21
|- style="background:#fbb;"
| 44
| January 17
| Charlotte
| 
| Barrett, Randle (18)
| Barrett (12)
| Quickley (7)
| Madison Square Garden19,812
| 22–22
|- style="background:#fbb;"
| 45
| January 18
| Minnesota
| 
| Fournier (27)
| Randle (9)
| Randle (9)
| Madison Square Garden16,071
| 22–23
|- style="background:#fbb;"
| 46
| January 20
| New Orleans
| 
| Barrett, Robinson (17)
| Robinson (15)
| Randle (6)
| Madison Square Garden16,168
| 22–24
|- style="background:#bfb;"
| 47
| January 23
| L.A. Clippers
| 
| Barrett (28)
| Barrett (14)
| Barrett, Quickley (6)
| Madison Square Garden19,812
| 23–24
|- style="background:#fbb;"
| 48
| January 24
| @ Cleveland
| 
| Barrett (24)
| Noel (13)
| Quickley (6)
| Rocket Mortgage FieldHouse17,321
| 23–25
|- style="background:#fbb;"
| 49
| January 26
| @ Miami
| 
| Toppin (18)
| Robinson (10)
| Quickley (7)
| FTX Arena19,600
| 23–26
|- style="background:#fbb;"
| 50
| January 28
| @ Milwaukee
| 
| Fournier (25)
| Randle (11)
| Walker (7)
| Fiserv Forum17,341
| 23–27
|- style="background:#bfb;"
| 51
| January 31
| Sacramento
| 
| Burks (21)
| Robinson (13)
| Noel (5)
| Madison Square Garden15,925
| 24–27

|- style="background:#fbb;"
| 52
| February 2
| Memphis
| 
| Fournier (30)
| Randle (12)
| Randle (9)
| Madison Square Garden19,812
| 24–28
|- style="background:#fbb;"
| 53
| February 5
| @ L.A. Lakers
| 
| Barrett (36)
| Randle (16)
| Randle (7)
| Crypto.com Arena18,997
| 24–29
|- style="background:#fbb;"
| 54
| February 7
| @ Utah
| 
| Randle (30)
| Robinson (21)
| Barrett (6)
| Vivint Arena18,306
| 24–30
|- style="background:#fbb;"
| 55
| February 8
| @ Denver
| 
| Randle (28)
| Randle (10)
| Walker (8)
| Ball Arena15,093
| 24–31
|- style="background:#bfb;"
| 56
| February 10
| @ Golden State
| 
| Randle (28)
| Randle (16)
| Randle (7)
| Chase Center18,064
| 25–31
|- style="background:#fbb;"
| 57
| February 12
| @ Portland
| 
| Randle (28)
| Randle (16)
| Randle (6)
| Moda Center18,521
| 25–32
|- style="background:#fbb;"
| 58
| February 14
| Oklahoma City
| 
| Randle (30)
| Robinson (17)
| Randle (10)
| Madison Square Garden18,433
| 25–33
|- style="background:#fbb;"
| 59
| February 16
| Brooklyn
| 
| Randle (31)
| Randle (10)
| Burks (5)
| Madison Square Garden18,916
| 25–34
|- style="background:#fbb;"
| 60
| February 25
| Miami
| 
| Barrett (46)
| Barrett, Robinson (9)
| Randle (8)
| Madison Square Garden19,812
| 25–35
|- style="background:#fbb;"
| 61
| February 27
| Philadelphia
| 
| Barrett, Fournier (24)
| Randle, Sims (10)
| Randle (7)
| Madison Square Garden19,812
| 25–36

|- style="background:#fbb;"
| 62
| March 2
| @ Philadelphia
| 
| Barrett (30)
| Burks, Robinson (7)
| Barrett (7)
| Wells Fargo Center21,333
| 25–37
|- style="background:#fbb;"
| 63
| March 4
| @ Phoenix
| 
| Randle (25)
| Robinson (15)
| Burks (6)
| Footprint Center17,071
| 25–38
|- style="background:#bfb;"
| 64
| March 6
| @ L.A. Clippers
| 
| Barrett (24)
| Robinson, Sims (11)
| Quickley (6)
| Crypto.com Arena17,422
| 26–38
|- style="background:#bfb;"
| 65
| March 7
| @ Sacramento
| 
| Randle (46)
| Randle (10)
| Barrett (6)
| Golden 1 Center14,720
| 27–38
|- style="background:#bfb;"
| 66
| March 9
| @ Dallas
| 
| Randle (26)
| Burks, Robinson (11)
| Quickley (6)
| American Airlines Center20,182
| 28–38
|- style="background:#fbb;"
| 67
| March 11
| @ Memphis
| 
| Randle (36)
| Robinson (16)
| Randle (6)
| FedExForum17,188
| 28–39
|- style="background:#fbb;"
| 68
| March 13
| @ Brooklyn
| 
| Randle (26)
| Sims (10)
| Burks (7)
| Barclays Center18,057
| 28–40
|- style="background:#bfb;"
| 69
| March 16
| Portland
| 
| Barrett (31)
| Randle (9)
| Randle (7)
| Madison Square Garden18,213
| 29–40
|- style="background:#bfb;"
| 70
| March 18
| Washington
| 
| Barrett, Randle (18)
| Randle (17)
| Quickley (5)
| Madison Square Garden19,812
| 30–40
|- style="background:#fbb;"
| 71
| March 20
| Utah
| 
| Barrett (24)
| Randle (11)
| Quickley (4)
| Madison Square Garden19,812
| 30–41
|- style="background:#fbb;"
| 72
| March 22
| Atlanta
| 
| Barrett (30)
| Barrett (13)
| Burks, Fournier (4)
| Madison Square Garden19,812
| 30–42
|- style="background:#bfb;"
| 73
| March 23
| @ Charlotte
| 
| Barrett (30)
| Toppin (11)
| Fournier, Quickley (7)
| Spectrum Center16,290
| 31–42
|- style="background:#bfb;"
| 74
| March 25
| @ Miami
| 
| Quickley (23)
| Barrett, Toppin (8)
| McBride (5)
| FTX Arena19,600
| 32–42
|- style="background:#bfb;"
| 75
| March 27
| @ Detroit
| 
| Barrett (21)
| Barrett, Robinson (9)
| Randle (5)
| Little Caesars Arena19,304
| 33–42
|- style="background:#bfb;"
| 76
| March 28
| Chicago
| 
| Barrett (28)
| Randle (13)
| Quickley, Randle (4)
| Madison Square Garden19,812
| 34–42
|- style="background:#fbb;"
| 77
| March 30
| Charlotte
| 
| Fournier (30)
| Burks (12)
| Randle (7)
| Madison Square Garden19,812
| 34–43

|- style="background:#fbb;"
| 78
| April 2
| Cleveland
| 
| Toppin (20)
| Quickley (7)
| Quickley (7)
| Madison Square Garden19,812
| 34–44
|- style="background:#bfb;"
| 79
| April 3
| @ Orlando
| 
| Barrett (27)
| Quickley, Robinson (10)
| Quickley (10)
| Amway Center15,747
| 35–44
|- style="background:#fbb;"
| 80
| April 6
| Brooklyn
| 
| Burks (24)
| Sims (13)
| Barrett (7)
| Madison Square Garden19,812
| 35–45
|- style="background:#bfb;"
| 81
| April 8
| @ Washington
| 
| Toppin (35)
| Sims (9)
| Quickley (10)
| Capital One Arena19,472
| 36–45
|- style="background:#bfb;"
| 82
| April 10
| Toronto
| 
| Toppin (42)
| Sims (14)
| Quickley (12)
| Madison Square Garden19,812
| 37–45

Player statistics

Regular season statistics
As of April 10, 2022

|-
| style="text-align:left;"| || 10 || 0 || 7.6 || .500 || .444 ||  || .8 || .4 || .1 || .0 || 1.6
|-
| style="text-align:left;"| || 70 || 70 || 34.5 || .408 || .342 || .714 || 5.8 || 3.0 || .6 || .2 || 20.0
|-
| style="text-align:left;"| || 81 || 44 || 28.6 || .391 || .404 || .822 || 4.9 || 3.0 || 1.0 || .3 || 11.7
|-
| style="text-align:left;"| || 2 || 0 || 10.5 || .500 || .000 ||  || 1.0 || .5 || .0 || .0 || 2.0
|-
| style="text-align:left;"| || 80 || 80 || 29.5 || .417 || .389 || .708 || 2.6 || 2.1 || 1.0 || .3 || 14.1
|-
| style="text-align:left;"| || 52 || 4 || 18.2 || .518 || .395 || .808 || 4.4 || .6 || .4 || .8 || 4.4
|-
| style="text-align:left;"| || 46 || 6 || 17.1 || .404 || .381 || .684 || 2.0 || 1.0 || .7 || .2 || 6.0
|-
| style="text-align:left;"| || 1 || 0 || 2.0 ||  ||  ||  || .0 || .0 || .0 || .0 || .0
|-
| style="text-align:left;"| || 1 || 0 || 3.0 || .000 || .000 ||  || .0 || .0 || .0 || .0 || .0
|-
| style="text-align:left;"| || 2 || 0 || 4.0 || .000 ||  ||  || .5 || .5 || .5 || .0 || .0
|-
| style="text-align:left;"| || 13 || 0 || 8.5 || .375 || .357 || .700 || 1.7 || .2 || .2 || .1 || 3.6
|-
| style="text-align:left;"| || 40 || 2 || 9.3 || .296 || .250 || .667 || 1.1 || 1.0 || .4 || .0 || 2.2
|-
| style="text-align:left;"| || 1 || 0 || 2.0 || .000 || .000 ||  || .0 || .0 || 1.0 || .0 || .0
|-
| style="text-align:left;"| || 25 || 11 || 22.5 || .533 || .000 || .700 || 5.6 || .9 || 1.2 || 1.2 || 3.4
|-
| style="text-align:left;"| || 78 || 3 || 23.1 || .392 || .346 || .881 || 3.2 || 3.5 || .7 || .0 || 11.3
|-
| style="text-align:left;"| || 72 || 72 || 35.3 || .411 || .308 || .756 || 9.9 || 5.1 || .7 || .5 || 20.1
|-
| style="text-align:left;"| || 15 || 0 || 14.3 || .415 || .258 || .906 || 1.4 || .7 || .8 || .3 || 6.1
|-
| style="text-align:left;"| || 72 || 62 || 25.7 || .761 ||  || .486 || 8.6 || .5 || .8 || 1.8 || 8.5
|-
| style="text-align:left;"| || 26 || 4 || 24.5 || .445 || .402 || .968 || 3.0 || 4.0 || .8 || .5 || 12.0
|-
| style="text-align:left;"| || 3 || 0 || 6.3 || .250 || .500 || .500 || .3 || .3 || .0 || .0 || 1.7
|-
| style="text-align:left;"| || 41 || 5 || 13.5 || .722 ||  || .414 || 4.1 || .5 || .3 || .5 || 2.2
|-
| style="text-align:left;"| || 72 || 10 || 17.1 || .531 || .308 || .758 || 3.7 || 1.1 || .3 || .5 || 9.0
|-
| style="text-align:left;"| || 37 || 37 || 25.6 || .403 || .367 || .845 || 3.0 || 3.5 || .7 || .2 || 11.6

Transactions

Trades

Additions

Subtractions

References

External links
 2021–22 New York Knicks at Basketball-Reference.com

New York Knicks
New York Knicks seasons
New York Knicks
New York Knicks
2020s in Manhattan
Madison Square Garden